Elia Zurbriggen (born 9 October 1990) is a Swiss former alpine ski racer. He is the son of former World Cup winner, World and Olympic champion Pirmin Zurbriggen and nephew of fellow alpine skier Heidi Zurbriggen.

He competed at the 2015 World Championships in Beaver Creek, USA, in the giant slalom.

References

1990 births
Swiss male alpine skiers
Living people
Place of birth missing (living people)